Phanomorpha persumptana is a moth in the family Crambidae. It was described by Francis Walker in 1863. It is found in Australia, where it has been recorded from both the mainland and Tasmania.

References

Moths described in 1863
Heliothelini